Seko may refer to:

Seko language, a language of Sulawesi, Indonesia
Seko, Indonesia, an area of South Sulawesi, Indonesia
Seko Rural LLG in Morobe Province, Papua New Guinea

People with the given name
Seko Fofana (born 1995), Ivorian footballer
, Japanese karateka

People with the surname
, Japanese footballer
Haruka Seko (born 1996), Japanese BMX rider
, Japanese screenwriter
, Japanese politician
Mobutu Sese Seko (1930 – 1997), dictator of Zaire from 1965 to 1997
, Japanese long-distance runner

Fiction
Seko, Khumba's father in Khumba

See also
Swedish Union for Service and Communications Employees, a trade union in Sweden

Japanese-language surnames